Events from the year 1196 in Ireland.

Incumbent
Lord: John

Births

Deaths
Mathghamhain mac Conchobar Maenmaige Ua Conchobair, Prince of Connacht